Kelly is an Australian children's television series that was broadcast on Network Ten from 1991 to 1992. The series was produced by Westbridge Entertainment and featured the adventures of a former police dog called Kelly.

Plot
Kelly is a highly trained German Shepherd police dog who needs to recover from an injury on duty. Sergeant Mike Patterson sends him to stay with his son's family. Kelly becomes the constant companion of Jo Patterson, Mike's granddaughter, and her friend Danny Foster. Kelly has many classic adventures with the family and other friends and was considered Australia's answer to Lassie and The Littlest Hobo.

Cast
 Charmaine Gorman as Jo Patterson
 Alexander Kemp as Danny Foster
 Gil Tucker as Frank Patterson
 Ailsa Piper as Maggie Patterson
 Katy Brinson as Dr. Robyn Foster
 Anthony Hawkins as Mike Patterson
 Matthew Ketteringham as Chris Patterson
 Joseph Spano as Brian Horton
 Simon Grey as Robbo
 Mat Lyons as Dino
 Orion Erickson as Flattop
 Lois Collinder
Anne Phelan as Rosie
 Dan Falzon as Paul
 Louise Siversen as Glennis
Pepe Trevor as Alice

Episodes

Season 1 (1991)

Season 2 (1992)

References

External links
 

1991 Australian television series debuts
Australian adventure television series
Australian children's television series
1992 Australian television series endings
Network 10 original programming
English-language television shows
Television shows about dogs
Television shows set in Victoria (Australia)
Police dogs in fiction